Michael Dwaine Phillips (born August 19, 1950), is an American former professional baseball player, a shortstop, second baseman, and third baseman who appeared in 712 Major League games from 1973 to 1983 for the San Francisco Giants, New York Mets, St. Louis Cardinals, San Diego Padres, and Montreal Expos.

Career
Born in Beaumont, Texas, Phillips attended MacArthur High School in Irving, Texas, and was selected by the Giants in the first round (18th pick overall) of the 1969 Major League Baseball draft. Phillips hit for the cycle on June 25, 1976, while playing for the Mets in a 7–4 victory over the Chicago Cubs. He was dealt from the Mets to the Cardinals for Joel Youngblood at the trade deadline on June 15, 1977.

Phillips registered 416 hits, including 46 doubles, 24 triples, and 11 home runs, during his MLB career.

Post-playing career
After his retirement as a player, Phillips worked for Dallas radio station KRLD in sports
marketing for nine years, for the Texas Rangers in corporate sponsorships for five years, and for the Kansas City Royals in corporate sales for seven years.

In 2015, Phillips was inducted into the Irving Independent School District Athletic Hall of Fame.

See also
 List of Major League Baseball players to hit for the cycle

References

Further reading

External links
, or Retrosheet

1950 births
Living people
Amarillo Giants players
American expatriate baseball players in Canada
Arizona Instructional League Giants players
Baseball players from Texas
Fresno Giants players
Great Falls Giants players
Major League Baseball shortstops
Montreal Expos players
New York Mets players
Phoenix Giants players
St. Louis Cardinals players
San Diego Padres players
San Francisco Giants players
Sportspeople from Beaumont, Texas
Wichita Aeros players